Colbert Michael Hamels (born December 27, 1983), nicknamed "Hollywood", is an American professional baseball pitcher in the San Diego Padres organization. He has played in Major League Baseball (MLB) for the Philadelphia Phillies (2006–2015), Texas Rangers (2015–2018), Chicago Cubs (2018–2019), and Atlanta Braves (2020).
Originally from San Diego, California, Hamels excelled at Rancho Bernardo High School both academically and athletically. The Phillies drafted Hamels out of high school, in the first round (17th overall) of the 2002 MLB Draft, and he began playing in the Phillies’ minor league system. Numerous issues, including an injury sustained in a bar fight, among other injuries, occurred during Hamels’ first few minor league seasons.

In May 2006, Hamels made his major league debut for the Phillies. After securing a long-term spot as a member of the Phillies starting rotation in his rookie season, he made large strides in the 2007 Major League Baseball season and won the Phillies' top major league pitcher award. Hamels was both the top pitcher on the team entering the  season, as well as during the Phillies' postseason run, during which they ultimately won the 2008 World Series over the Tampa Bay Rays; he won the World Series Most Valuable Player Award. After the 2008 season, Hamels signed a three-year contract with the Phillies. His statistics declined over the next two seasons, as he struggled through a tumultuous  campaign and somewhat bounced back in  – however, still not approaching his 2008 numbers. Over the next few seasons, Hamels was joined by fellow All-Star pitchers Roy Halladay, Cliff Lee, and Roy Oswalt. With the decline of his aging teammates, the team missed the postseason for the next few years, but he remained one of the Phillies' consistent stars. In 2020, he was shut down for the season after pitching only  innings.

Early life
Hamels attended Meadowbrook Middle School and Rancho Bernardo High School in San Diego. He was a "gifted student", and scored a 1510 (out of 1600) on the SAT. However, some teams lost interest when Hamels broke his left humerus during his sophomore year. Nonetheless, Hamels was drafted in the first round of the 2002 Major League Baseball draft by the Philadelphia Phillies with the 17th overall selection.

Professional career

Minor league career
Hamels began his professional baseball career in 2003, pitching for the Class A Lakewood BlueClaws of the South Atlantic League. Later that season, he was promoted to the Clearwater Threshers of the Class A-Advanced Florida State League. He finished the year by receiving the Paul Owens Award, given to the best pitcher in the Phillies' minor league system.

During the next two seasons, however, Hamels suffered through several injuries, and pitched only sparingly. He missed most of the 2004 season with elbow tendinitis, making only four starts. In 2005, he broke his pitching hand in a bar fight before the season began; after rehabilitation, he was assigned to Clearwater. In July, the Phillies promoted him to the Class AA Reading Phillies of the Eastern League, where he surrendered the first home run of his professional career in his first start. Subsequently, he was shut down for the remainder of the season with back spasms.

In 2006, a healthy Hamels started again at Clearwater, and after a brief stint in Reading, he was promoted to the Scranton/Wilkes-Barre Red Barons of the Class AAA International League. In three games at Scranton, he struck out 36 batters while giving up only one walk and one run. His minor league statistics included a record of 14–4 with a 1.43 ERA and 273 strikeouts in 35 games pitched. For his performance, the Phillies promoted him to the major league club.

Philadelphia Phillies

2006 season
Hamels was called up to the Philadelphia Phillies in May 2006. In his Major League Baseball debut on May 12, he pitched five scoreless innings, allowed one hit, struck out seven batters and walked five while earning a no-decision against the Cincinnati Reds. In his second career start, Hamels was dominant until the seventh inning, during which he was pulled after he allowed several baserunners, but again received a no-decision. A shoulder injury scratched Hamels from the lineup of what would have originally been his third major league start. He was put on the 15-day disabled list and returned on June 6 to defeat the Arizona Diamondbacks 10–1 for his first Major League victory. On August 14, 2006, Hamels had his best start of his rookie season, shutting out the New York Mets over eight innings and striking out nine in the Phillies' 13–0 victory. He finished his rookie season with a 9–8 record, a 4.08 earned run average (ERA), and 145 strikeouts (third among NL rookies) in  innings (sixth among NL rookies).

2007 season

Hamels entered the 2007 season having done significant work in the weight room in the offseason and at spring training. His tenacity came to fruition when, on April 21, 2007, Hamels pitched his first major league complete game, allowing one run on five hits and two walks while setting a career high with 15 strikeouts. Just three days before, the Phillies moved their opening day starter Brett Myers to the bullpen to be the closer, making Hamels the team's number one starter. On May 16, he carried a perfect game into the seventh inning, but then walked leadoff hitter Rickie Weeks and surrendered a home run to the next batter, J. J. Hardy.

For his strong performance during the first half of the season, Hamels was, for the first time in his career, selected a member of the NL All Star Team. As Hamels had been the Phillies only consistent starter to that point, even to the point that one columnist said the Phillies are a joke "as long as we are forced to look forward to someone other than Cole Hamels on the mound", the Phillies acquired Kyle Lohse to supplement the rotation soon before the trading deadline. Several weeks later, Hamels was placed on the 15-day disabled list (DL) with a mild left elbow strain. After the Phillies activated him from the DL, on September 28, he helped the Phillies take over first place in the National League East by striking out 13 Washington Nationals over 8 innings in a 6–0 win. Two days later, the team clinched a spot in the playoffs for the first time in 14 years. In the first game of the National League Division Series, he started for the Phillies, but surrendered three runs, three hits, and an "uncharacteristic" four walks, while striking out seven in  innings; he was assessed the loss. Ultimately, the Phillies lost the series. Hamels finished with a regular-season record of 15–5, a 3.39 ERA, and 177 strikeouts in  innings. The Philadelphia chapter of the Baseball Writers' Association of America presented him the "Steve Carlton Most Valuable Pitcher" award.

2008 season

Before the season began in March, Hamels made a complaint about the Phillies underpaying him, saying it was a "low blow" and he was "caught off-guard" with the gap between what he and his agent John Boggs felt was a fair reward for his performance in the previous season and what he was paid (the Phillies paid him , barely above the minimum salary for MLB players despite Hamels' strong performance).

Though Hamels was the "clear-cut ace", Charlie Manuel penciled in Brett Myers as the Phillies' opening day starter because Myers accepted his role as closer the preceding season, putting the team ahead of his personal wishes to start.

By the end of April, Hamels led the Phillies in most pitching categories, including wins (3), ERA (2.70), and innings pitched. Continuing his dominance into May, Hamels recorded his first career complete game shutout against the Atlanta Braves on the 15th of that month. By June, Myers had been demoted to the minor leagues due to his ineffectiveness, leaving Hamels alone atop the rotation. Hamels was snubbed from a selection to the All-Star Game despite strong numbers. For the season, Hamels was 14–10 with a 3.09 ERA and 196 strikeouts in  innings; he had the lowest on-base percentage-against (OBP) in the majors at .272. FanGraphs also rated his changeup as the most effective in the majors.

Hamels pitched in Game 1 of the National League Division Series against the Brewers, pitching "eight spectacular two-hit shutout innings" during which he struck out nine hitters, notching his first career playoff win, and the Phillies' first playoff win since 1993. He commented, "I knew the importance of the game. And it's something where, because of last year, I learned what it really takes in trying to ... kind of mellow out, not to have that sort of excitement where you can't really control everything." He was named the Most Valuable Player (MVP) of the National League Championship Series, going 2–0 in the NLCS with a 1.93 ERA and winning the series clincher on October 15 in Los Angeles.

Hamels was selected the Phillies starter for Game 1 of the World Series; the Phillies won 3–2, and Hamels earned his fourth win of the postseason. Hamels also started Game 5, which was suspended due to rain after the top of the sixth inning tied at 2–2, and receiving a no-decision; when Game 5 resumed the Phillies won 4–3 to clinch the World Series. Overall, Hamels made five postseason starts in 2008, going 4–0 with a 1.80 ERA. Hamels threw a total of 35 innings during the postseason, and held opponents scoreless in 28 of them; he never allowed more than one run in any of the seven innings in which he did not hold opponents scoreless. Hamels was named the 2008 World Series MVP.

Subsequently, Jayson Stark wrote,

The Philadelphia chapter of the Baseball Writers' Association of America presented him the "Steve Carlton Most Valuable Pitcher" award for the second consecutive year.

2009 season
Hamels started his 2009 season by signing a three-year, $20.5 million contract with the Phillies. On February 14, the first day of spring training for pitchers and catchers, when asked who the Opening Day starter would be, manager Charlie Manuel responded, "Yeah, you might as well go ahead and pencil him in. I don't think there's any sense in me playing games. Go ahead, pencil him in."

However, Hamels left spring training on March 16 after feeling tightness between innings, and flew to Philadelphia to have his left elbow examined by Dr. Michael Ciccotti. "This will obviously set me back a couple of days, and I don't think that should be a big deal", said Hamels. Ciccotti found no structural damage in his arm, yet Hamels still did not pitch on Opening Day as expected; Myers did for the third consecutive season. For the first time in his career, Hamels went winless in his first four starts, and left back-to-back starts early due to injury in late April, sustaining a left-shoulder contusion and an ankle sprain respectively. From June on, however, he returned to his previous form, recording two complete-game shutouts (tied for the NL-lead), striking out at least 10 batters in two separate games, and amassing a 21-inning scoreless streak from August 21 to September 6, while allowing just two home runs in his final eight starts. In July, the Phillies augmented their starting rotation by acquiring two former Cy Young Award winners in Cliff Lee and Pedro Martínez from a trade and a free agent signing respectively. Due to his early season injury struggles, Hamels posted a 10–11 record and a 4.32 ERA in the regular season, his first major league season in which he posted a sub-.500 record, and the worst ERA of his career to that point.

Hamels started Game 2 of the 2009 National League Division Series against the Colorado Rockies, allowing four earned runs through five innings to take the loss. Nevertheless, the Phillies won the series, three games to one. He earned the win in Game 1 of the National League Championship Series as the Phillies beat the Dodgers, 8–6. Hamels started Game 3 of the World Series against the New York Yankees, pitching  innings, allowing 5 earned runs and taking the loss as the Yankees won that game 8–5. Afterward, he told reporters, "I can't wait for it (the season) to end. It's been mentally draining. It's one of those things where, a year in, you just can't wait for a fresh start", comments that were criticized by manager Charlie Manuel but otherwise largely regarded as speaking out of frustration. Later in the series, after the Phillies won game five, a confrontational Brett Myers mockingly asked Hamels: "What are you doing here? I thought you quit." Years later, in 2018, Hamels joked that Yankee fans love him due to the fact that he helped them win the series. The Phillies lost the series to the New York Yankees in six games.

Rob Neyer, a sabermetrician and columnist for ESPN.com, contradicted anyone who asserted Hamels' skills had deteriorated, instead commenting:

Phillies' pitching coach Rich Dubee and Hamels himself blamed Hamels' demeanor for some of his decline, noting, "He is such a perfectionist...his approach wasn't very good last year. His success won't come back until his demeanor changes" and "The more angry you get, it's that much tougher to execute your next pitch. I think I let [expectations] get to me" respectively.

2010 season

Entering the 2010 season, the Phillies traded away Cliff Lee, but in doing so, acquired Roy Halladay in a "mega-trade". They did not re-sign Myers, and Halladay was named the Phillies' opening day starter. Among Hamels' season highlights were a start on June 7 against the San Diego Padres during which he threw  innings of no-hit baseball, winning five consecutive starts including three consecutive scoreless starts from late-August to mid-September, and striking out 13 batters, tied for his second-highest career total, on September 13 against the Florida Marlins.

The Phillies finished with the best record in MLB. Hamels started Game 3 of the National League Division Series against the Cincinnati Reds and, for the first time in his postseason career, pitched a complete-game shutout. He also became the first pitcher to win a postseason game
at Great American Ball Park. The Phillies advanced to the National League Championship Series facing the San Francisco Giants, where Hamels took the loss in Game 3 giving up three runs as the Giants' Matt Cain shutout the Phillies, en route to the Phillies' ultimate elimination in six games.

Statistically, Hamels rebounded from his previous season by posting a 12–11 record with a 3.06 ERA, the latter of which was, at the time, a career-best. He also struck out a career-high 211 batters. Moreover, he received the fifth-lowest run support in the NL. Nevertheless, he allowed three or fewer earned runs in 26 of his 33 starts. Jeff Nelson "facetiously" evaluated Hamels' season as follows:

2011 season
On December 15, 2010, Cliff Lee returned to the Phillies as he signed a free-agent contract with Philadelphia for five years and $120 million with a vesting option for a sixth year. After this signing, the Phillies' starting rotation consisted of Roy Halladay, Roy Oswalt, Cliff Lee, Cole Hamels, and Joe Blanton. This rotation was considered one of the best in pitching history by many. Halladay, Oswalt, Lee, and Hamels were dubbed the 'Phantastic Phour' by fans and the media.

Hamels entered the 2011 season with a large amount of excitement and hype from fans and the media. By the All-Star game, Hamels was 4–3. On July 3, when the rosters for the 2011 MLB All-Star Game in Phoenix, Arizona were broadcast on TBS, it was announced that Hamels was voted onto the National League team along with fellow pitchers and teammates Roy Halladay, Cliff Lee, Plácido Polanco, and Shane Victorino. He was not eligible to play, however, because he had pitched the Sunday prior to the All-Star Game. Hamels shared his dismay with this rule, saying, "It's one of those things where people who don't play the game make the rules."

The Phillies finished with the best record in MLB for the second year in a row. In the 2011 National League Division Series against the St. Louis Cardinals, Hamels started Game 3 which resulted in a 3–2 win to give the Phillies a 2–1 series lead, however the Phillies would lose Games 4 and 5 to be eliminated.

Hamels finished the 2011 season with a record of 14–9, 194 strikeouts, an ERA of 2.79, and a 0.986 WHIP. He finished fifth in the Cy Young Award voting behind Clayton Kershaw, Roy Halladay, Cliff Lee, and Ian Kennedy, respectively.

2012 season

During the 2011 off-season, Hamels underwent elbow and hernia surgeries. Hamels had missed scheduled starts in August due to a stiff shoulder, and loose bodies were removed from his elbow to fix his problems. Hamels was ready to pitch by the start of Spring training 2012.

On January 17, Hamels and the Philadelphia Phillies agreed to a one-year, $15 million contract to avoid arbitration. This was the highest salary ever paid to a pitcher eligible for arbitration before free agency.

On May 6, Hamels was suspended for five games after hitting Bryce Harper in his lower back with a pitch, after admitting that it was intentional. On July 21, 2012, Hamels hit his first career home run off San Francisco Giants pitcher Matt Cain, who had homered off of him in the top half of the same inning, the first time in MLB since 1990 that two pitchers had hit home runs off of each other in the same inning.

Hamels would stay a Phillie when he agreed to a contract extension on July 24. The six-year, $144 million contract was the second-largest contract ever signed by a pitcher. The deal included a vesting option for 2019 worth $24 million. If the option did not vest, it would have turned into a club option for $20 million that included a $6 million buyout.

Hamels finished the season with career highs in wins (17) and strikeouts (216), and finished eighth in the NL Cy Young Award voting. His 3.05 ERA ranked second-best in his career (behind only his 2.79 ERA in 2011). The Philadelphia chapter of the Baseball Writers' Association of America presented him the "Steve Carlton Most Valuable Pitcher" award.

2013 season
Before the 2013 season in spring training, manager Charlie Manuel named Hamels the 2013 opening day starter, which Matt Gelb of The Philadelphia Inquirer wrote was a "long time coming". In his first career opening day start on April 1 against the Atlanta Braves, Hamels surrendered five earned runs in five innings and took the loss.

Particularly early in the season, Hamels was plagued by a lack of run support; as of May 27, he had the fifth-lowest in the major leagues. He lost his eighth start on May 27, declining to a record of 1–8, which one Sports Illustrated column attributed more to the Phillies poor offense than Hamels. Nevertheless, it was "easily ... Hamels' worst performance of his eight-year career". Aside from offensive struggles while Hamels was pitching, the Phillies defense struggled, though Hamels kept a positive attitude, once commenting that his luck should improve, as "I've been doing pretty well on the plane in poker." Towards the end of the season, however, Hamels "put it together". In his final 11 starts he surrendered more than three runs only once. In total, he amassed an 8–14 record with a 3.60 ERA in 220 innings and 202 strikeouts (sixth in NL). Despite struggles from his teammates, Bill Baer noted that Hamels,

Despite Hamels' poor record and ERA, 25 of his 33 starts were quality starts, and thus he gave his team a chance to win 25 times, yet only got eight wins.

2014 season

Before the 2014 season, Hamels announced that he would not be ready to pitch on Opening Day because of tendonitis in his biceps. On April 6 Hamels pitched a re-hab game in a Minor League Class A-Advanced game, striking out four while allowing two earned runs on three hits in four innings. He made his first start of the season on April 23.

Despite lack of run support contributing to a poor win–loss record, Hamels was among the best pitchers in the National League, and was even mentioned as a Cy Young candidate. On September 1, Hamels pitched six innings of a Phillies combined no-hitter against the Atlanta Braves. Hamels was pulled for a pinch hitter in the top of the seventh due to having five walks, a hit-batter, and 108 pitches through six innings. Overall, Hamels was the only consistent star on the Phillies, finished sixth in Cy Young voting, and was frequently mentioned as a candidate to be traded in the offseason to bolster the Phillies' lackluster farm system, after he avoided being dealt at the July trading deadline.

2015 season
At the start of the 2015 season, there was much focus and speculation regarding trade possibilities surrounding Hamels. The Boston Red Sox, Los Angeles Dodgers, Texas Rangers, Chicago Cubs, New York Yankees, and San Francisco Giants expressed interest in trading for him during the 2015 season.

On July 25, 2015, in what would be his final start for the Phillies before being traded, Hamels no-hit the Chicago Cubs 5–0 at Wrigley Field, striking out 13 and giving up only two walks, both to Dexter Fowler, and besting the Cubs' Jake Arrieta—himself a no-hit pitcher a month later, on August 30 of that season. It was the first no-hitter against the Cubs since Sandy Koufax's perfect game in 1965, and first at Wrigley since the Cubs' Milt Pappas in 1972. Hamels also joined Vida Blue, Mike Witt, Kent Mercker and Kevin Millwood as no-hit pitchers who also pitched in a combined no-hitter.

Texas Rangers

Remainder of 2015 season
On July 31, 2015, Hamels was traded to the Texas Rangers along with Jake Diekman in exchange for Matt Harrison, Nick Williams, Jorge Alfaro, Jake Thompson, Alec Asher, and Jerad Eickhoff. Hamels became the first pitcher to be traded during a regular season after pitching a no-hitter in his final start with the team that traded him. Bert Blyleven had been the last pitcher to pitch a no-hitter in his final start with the team that traded him; after pitching a no-hitter for the Rangers in his final start of the 1977 season, he was traded to the Pittsburgh Pirates that offseason.

With the Rangers, Hamels went 7–1 in 12 starts with a 3.66 ERA. The Rangers were under .500 as late as August 3 but posted a winning record for the remainder of the 2015 season and eventually overtook the Houston Astros in September for the American League West division lead. The Rangers clinched the AL West title on the final day of the season, as Hamels threw a complete-game three-hitter in a 9–2 win over the Los Angeles Angels, the team's 6th division title and 7th postseason appearance in franchise history. Hamels' positive effect on the Rangers was compared to that of the Toronto Blue Jays' David Price, another ace starting pitcher who helped spearhead a run to the postseason after blending in seamlessly with a struggling team who acquired him at the trade deadline.

The Rangers lost to the Blue Jays in five games in the Division Series after squandering a 2–0 series lead. Hamels received a no-decision in Game 2 as he left the game tied, but the Rangers won in 14 innings. Hamels started Game 5, and was pulled in the bottom of the 7th inning while the Rangers were leading 3–2, after Ranger infielders allowed the first three Jays batters to reach base on three consecutive errors; the Jays subsequently scored 4 runs to win 6–3, and Hamels was charged with the loss as he was responsible for the runners on base. (Only two of the runs he was charged with surrendering were earned.)

2016 season
Hamels was named the Opening Day starter for the Rangers in 2016. On Opening Day, after allowing two home runs in two innings, Hamels calmed down to pitch 7 strong innings, while only allowing two runs on four hits and eight strikeouts for a 2016 Opening Day win against the Seattle Mariners. On June 12, in a start against Seattle, Hamels recorded his 2,000th career strikeout, becoming the 77th player, and 7th active player, to reach the milestone. He was named to the 2016 MLB All-Star Game. On September 28, at home against the Milwaukee Brewers, Hamels claimed his 200th strikeout of the season.

Hamels finished the 2016 season with a 15–5 record and a 3.32 ERA in 32 starts. He led major league pitchers in percent of balls pulled against him (47.1%).

2017 season

On May 3, 2017, Hamels was placed on the 15-day disabled list due to a strained right oblique muscle. He was ruled out for eight weeks. In 24 starts for the 2017 season, he compiled an 11–6 record and a 4.20 ERA.

2018 season
Hamels opened the season as the Rangers ace. In 20 starts, Hamels was 5–9 with a 4.72 ERA in  innings.

Chicago Cubs
On July 27, 2018, Hamels was traded to the Chicago Cubs in exchange for Eddie Butler, Rollie Lacy, and Alexander Ovalles. He made his first appearance as a Cub on August 1, striking out nine. He gave up one unearned run and three hits in five innings, earning the win. On August 23, Hamels threw a complete game against the Cincinnati Reds, only allowing one run. Through his first five starts with the Cubs he was 4–0 with a 0.79 ERA, and the team won all five of the games.

For the 2018 season between the two teams, he was 9–12 with a 3.78 ERA, and led the major leagues in hit batsmen, with 19. He also led the majors in giving up the highest percentage of hard-hit balls (41.9%).

Hamels pitched in relief in the Cubs’ 2018 Wild Card loss to the Colorado Rockies. He allowed two hits and a walk over two scoreless innings.

For the 2019 season, he was 7–7 with a 3.81 ERA in 147.2 innings over 27 starts.

Atlanta Braves
On December 4, 2019, Hamels signed a one-year, $18 million free agent contract with the Atlanta Braves.

During spring training, Hamels suffered a shoulder injury and was not expected to be able to pitch at the start of the 2020 season. However, the COVID-19 pandemic delayed the start of the regular season until July 24, with Hamels expected to make the Opening Day roster.

In 2020, he made only one start, pitching  innings and giving up three earned runs against the Baltimore Orioles on September 16.

Los Angeles Dodgers
On August 4, 2021, Hamels was signed by the Los Angeles Dodgers for $1 million through the remainder of the 2021 season, plus $200,000 for each game he started in the major leagues. However, he experienced arm pain while throwing a simulated game in Arizona and was placed on the 60-day injured list, ending his comeback attempt.

San Diego Padres
On February 16, 2023, Hamels signed a minor league contract with the San Diego Padres organization.

Scouting report
Hamels is known for possessing one of the better changeups in the game. In 2012, Fangraphs ranked Hamels as having the fourth best changeup in the game trailing only Jason Vargas, Tommy Milone, and Félix Hernández. The Hardball Times called his changeup a "killer" pitch to right-handed hitters, noting that while it is also effective against left-handed hitters, when they put it in play, they generally have success. Rangers pitching coach Mike Maddux said of Hamels,

The development of Hamels' changeup is attributed by his high school pitching coach, Mark Furtak, to his having broken his arm in high school. He could no longer work on his curveball for several months, and was forced to focus on the changeup. Chipper Jones, who was a star third baseman for the rival Atlanta Braves commented that Hamels is the "best lefthander in the National League ... you have to respect his fastball, and his change-up is devastating. If you're guessing fastball and you get change-up, you're way out in front of it. His change-up is a soft sinker that just falls down." Aside from the changeup, he throws a four-seam fastball in the low 90s (can reach ), a cutter , and an "inconsistent" curveball that sometimes loops and other times is sharp, and hovers in the mid-70s (around ). Prior to the conception and advent of his cutter, he briefly threw a two-seam fastball around 2008 and 2009, before debuting his cutter in 2010. Once he attained a "feel" for how to effectively utilize his cutter, it helped him increase his groundball rate (percentage of balls in play that were groundballs), to over 50 percent in 2011.

Personal life

Family
Hamels, who is of Dutch descent, is the oldest of three children. He grew up in San Diego, where his parents still live. Hamels and his wife, Heidi Strobel, whom he married on December 31, 2006, continued to raise their children in Philadelphia. Strobel was born in Buffalo, Missouri, and grew up there with her parents and her two younger sisters. As a child, she used to sell chicken eggs and publish her own neighborhood newspaper. After high school, she attended Drury University in Springfield, where she earned a Bachelor of Arts degree in exercise physiology, secondary education, and physical education.
Strobel was a contestant on the sixth season of the reality show Survivor. They have four children together; two biological sons, an adopted daughter from Ethiopia, and another daughter.

The family was living in a Newtown Square home that they built in 2014, but they put it up for sale in 2021. They own a home in Southlake, Texas. The family built a home in Branson, Missouri, where Strobel was raised, but instead chose to relocate to Texas, and they then donated the home to Camp Barnabas, a camp for children with special needs.

The Hamels Foundation
Hamels created and currently runs an organization known as The Hamels Foundation with his wife, Heidi. The foundation was created in 2009. The Hamels Foundation funds childhood programs in Philadelphia and Africa.

In 2017, Hamels and his wife donated their  Missouri mansion, valued at an estimated $10 million, to Camp Barnabas, a Christian charity that runs camps for children with special needs and chronic illnesses. Hamels said in a statement, "There are tons of amazing charities in Southwest Missouri. Out of all of these, Barnabas really pulled on our heartstrings. Seeing the faces, hearing the laughter, reading the stories of the kids they serve; there is truly nothing like it. Barnabas makes dreams come true, and we felt called to help them in a big way."

See also

 List of Major League Baseball annual shutout leaders
 List of Major League Baseball career strikeout leaders
 List of Major League Baseball career Wins Above Replacement leaders
 List of Major League Baseball no-hitters
 List of Major League Baseball pitchers who have thrown an immaculate inning
 List of people from San Diego
 List of Philadelphia Phillies award winners and league leaders
 List of Philadelphia Phillies no-hitters
 List of World Series starting pitchers

References

External links

Cole Hamels 

1983 births
Living people
Baseball players from San Diego
American people of Dutch descent
American League All-Stars
National League All-Stars
World Series Most Valuable Player Award winners
National League Championship Series MVPs
Major League Baseball pitchers
Philadelphia Phillies players
Texas Rangers players
Chicago Cubs players
Atlanta Braves players
Clearwater Phillies players
Clearwater Threshers players
Reading Phillies players
Scranton/Wilkes-Barre Red Barons players
Lakewood BlueClaws players
Rancho Bernardo High School alumni